Johnsoniini is a tribe of flesh flies in the family Sarcophagidae. There are about 7 genera and 12 described species in Johnsoniini.

Genera
These seven genera belong to the tribe Johnsoniini:
Camptops Aldrich, 1916 i g
Erucophaga Reinhard, 1963 i g
Harpagopyga Aldrich, 1916 i g
Johnsonia Coquillett, 1895 i g
Lepidodexia Brauer & von Bergenstamm, 1891 c g b
Rafaelia Townsend, 1917 i c g b
Sthenopyga Aldrich, 1916 i
Data sources: i = ITIS, c = Catalogue of Life, g = GBIF, b = Bugguide.net

References

Further reading

External links

 
 

Sarcophagidae
Brachycera tribes